The 1963 Utah State Aggies football team was an American football team that represented Utah State University as an independent during the 1963 NCAA University Division football season. In their first season under head coach Tony Knap, the Aggies compiled an 8–2 record and outscored all opponents by a total of 318 to 99.

The team's statistical leaders included Bill Munson with 1,699 passing yards, Larry Campbell with 585 rushing yards, Roger Foulk with 229 receiving yards, and Darrell Steele with 52 points scored.

Schedule

References

Utah State
Utah State Aggies football seasons
Utah State Aggies football